Otocinclus xakriaba is a species of suckermouth catfish native to the São Francisco river basin in South America.

O. xakriaba is a Batesian mimic that mimics juvenile Corydoras garbei. The mechanism driving the mimicry is unknown.

References

Hypoptopomatini
Fish of the São Francisco River basin
Taxa named by Scott Allen Schaefer
Fish described in 1997